The Italian Catholic Diocese of Nicosia is in Sicily. It is a suffragan of the Archdiocese of Messina-Lipari-Santa Lucia del Mela.

The current bishop is Salvatore Muratore.

History

The diocese of Nicosia has existed since 1817. Its first bishop was Cajetan M. Averna. Within the diocese is the ancient city of Troina, which was briefly an episcopal see from 1087 to 1090.

Bishops

Gaetano Maria Avarna (1818–1841 Died)
Rosario Vincenzo Benza (1844–1847 Died)
Camillo Milana (1851–1858 Died)
Melchiorre Lo Piccolo (1858–1881 Died)
Bernardo Cozzucli (Cozzuoli) (1881–1902 Died)
Ferdinando Fiandaca (1903–1912 Appointed, Bishop of Patti)
Felice Agostino Addeo, O.S.A. (1913–1942 Resigned)
Pio Giardina (1942–1953 Died)
Clemente Gaddi (1953–1962 Appointed, Coadjutor Archbishop of Siracusa)
Costantino Trapani, O.F.M. (1962–1976 Appointed, Coadjutor Bishop of Mazara del Vallo)
Salvatore Di Salvo (1976–1984 Resigned)
Pio Vittorio Vigo (1984–1985), Apostolic Administrator
Pio Vittorio Vigo (1985–1997 Appointed, Archbishop of Monreale)
Salvatore Pappalardo (1998–2008 Appointed, Archbishop of Siracusa) (He is not the Salvatore Pappalardo who was Archbishop of Palermo and who became Cardinal in 1973.)
Salvatore Muratore (2009– )

Notes

External links
 

Nicosia
Religious organizations established in 1817
Nicosia
1817 establishments in the Kingdom of the Two Sicilies
Nicosia, Sicily